Ulderico Marcelli, also known as Rico Marcelli (October 3, 1882 – August 17, 1962), was a 20th-century Italian composer who became known in the United States for writing operas and musical accompaniment for dramatic performances, and for his skill as an orchestra conductor.

On Christmas Day in 1937, Marcelli married a second time, to the soloist violin player of the Fibber McGee band, Audrey Call. The couple had one son, Victor Ottavio Marcelli, who joined the Bohemian Club in his adulthood.

In his leisure, Marcelli painted in oils, mostly landscapes. Two were exhibited at the Bohemian Club in 1922: "Cabeza de Estudio" and "A Bit of Old California."

Marcelli died in Sunland, Los Angeles, California on August 17, 1962, survived by his wife Audrey Call Marcelli. She died on June 3, 2001 in Sonoma, California, and left as a memorial the Audrey Call Marcelli Music Scholarship, awarded annually to one student at Santa Rosa Junior College.

Works
1914 – Maimundis, a one-act opera
1914 – Marseillaise, the musical accompaniment to a dramatic work by Andre Ferrier
1918 – Water Colors: Four Symphonic Sketches, performed by the San Francisco Symphony 1918–1919 as a "pops concert"
1920 – Ilya of Murom, a Grove Play
1937 – Lifkronen, a Grove Play
...including The Berserker Dance and The Song of Victory
1952 – Tandem Triumphans, a Grove Play
1955 – Don Quijote, a Grove Play
1958 – Aloha Oe: a Legend of Hawaii, a Grove Play
1961 – A Soldier and Mr. Lincoln, a Grove Play

References

1882 births
1962 deaths
Italian composers
Italian male composers
Italian male conductors (music)
Italian emigrants to the United States
20th-century Italian conductors (music)
20th-century Italian male musicians